Owczary  (German Oetscher) is a village in the administrative district of Gmina Górzyca, within Słubice County, Lubusz Voivodeship, in western Poland, close to the German border. The village has a population of 130.

References

Owczary